Isabella is a remote unincorporated community in Stony River Township, Lake County, Minnesota, United States.

Isabella is located within the Superior National Forest.

See also
 Little Isabella River

References

Unincorporated communities in Minnesota
Unincorporated communities in Lake County, Minnesota